Nova Olinda do Norte is a municipality located in the Brazilian state of Amazonas. Its population was 38,026 (2020) and its area is 5,609 km². The town is located on the banks of the lower Madeira River.

The municipality contains a small part of the  Pau-Rosa National Forest, created in 2001.

References

Municipalities in Amazonas (Brazilian state)